495th may refer to:

495th Bombardment Squadron, inactive United States Air Force unit
495th Fighter Squadron, inactive United States Air Force unit

See also
495 (number)
495, the year 495 (CDXCV) of the Julian calendar
495 BC